Eucoryphus is a genus of flies in the family Dolichopodidae, with three species known from the Palearctic. It is found in the Alps and the mountains of southern Corsica.

Species
The following three species are included in the genus:
 Eucoryphus brunneri Mik, 1869 – Austria, Germany, Italy and Switzerland
 Eucoryphus coeruleus Becker, 1889 – Austria, France, Germany, Italy and Switzerland
 Eucoryphus piscariviverus Pusch, Stark & Pollet, 2020 – France (Corsica)

References

Dolichopodidae genera
Hydrophorinae
Diptera of Europe
Taxa named by Josef Mik